Ghost Brigade is a 1993 American supernatural horror film.

Ghost Brigade may also refer to:

Arts and entertainment

 Ghost Brigade, a 1993 American supernatural horror film
 Ghost Brigade (band)
 The Ghost Brigades, a 2006 science fiction novel
 Ghost Brigade (song), a 2022 song by the rock band Creeper

Military

 1st Stryker Brigade Combat Team (SBCT) referred to as the Ghost Brigade
 9th Special Forces Brigade referred to as the Ghost Brigade
 Prizrak Brigade referred to as the Ghost Brigade
 3rd Brigade, 3rd Infantry Division referred to as the Phantom Brigade

See also 
 Phantom Brigade, a 2020 video game
 The Trenchcoat Brigade, a comic book series published in 1999